Mathew William Pillans (born 4 July 1991) is a South African cricketer who plays for Yorkshire, having previously played for Surrey. Primarily a right-arm fast-medium bowler, he also bats right handed. Pillans holds a British passport.

In August 2018, Pillans signed a three-year contract with Yorkshire, and joined them initially on loan until the end of the 2018 season.

References

External links
 

1991 births
Living people
South African cricketers
Cricketers from Pretoria
Surrey cricketers
KwaZulu-Natal Inland cricketers
Leicestershire cricketers
Yorkshire cricketers
South African emigrants to the United Kingdom
English cricketers
South African people of English descent